European Coalition (CE) was a Spanish electoral list in the European Parliament election in 1999 made up from centre-right, regionalist and moderate nationalist parties.

Composition

Electoral performance

European Parliament

Defunct political party alliances in Spain
Regionalist parties in Spain